The Suffolk Records Society is a local text publication society founded in 1957 to promote the study and preservation of Suffolk records from the Middle Ages to the present day. The society has published over 80 volumes as of 2015, divided into two-book series, the Charters series for charters of Suffolk, and the General series.

References 

History of Suffolk
1957 establishments in England
Organisations based in Suffolk
Historical societies of the United Kingdom
Text publication societies